On Time is the debut studio album by American rock band Grand Funk Railroad. The album was released on August 25, 1969, by Capitol Records. Recorded at Cleveland Recording Company, the album was produced by Terry Knight. "Time Machine", the band's first single release, just made it into the top 50 in the singles charts, reaching #48.

After the success of their second album Grand Funk (also known as The Red Album) in 1970, On Time went gold, one of four RIAA gold record awards for the band that year. The other two albums reaching gold status in 1970 for Grand Funk Railroad were Closer to Home and Live Album.

In 2002, On Time was remastered on CD with bonus tracks and also released in a limited edition box set Trunk of Funk that contained the band's first four albums. The "trunk" has slots for twelve CDs to house the future release of the remaining eight albums that were released by Capitol Records. Also included is a pair of "Shinin' On" 3D glasses, guitar pick and a sticker reproducing a concert ticket.

Track listing
All tracks written by Mark Farner.

Personnel
 Mark Farner – guitar, piano, harmonica, vocals
 Mel Schacher – bass
 Don Brewer – drums, vocals

Charts
Album

Singles

References

1969 debut albums
Grand Funk Railroad albums
Albums produced by Terry Knight
Capitol Records albums